Walwyn is a surname. Notable people with the surname include:

Charles Walwyn (1883–1959), British Army officer
John Walwyn (by 1520–1566 or later), English politician
Keith Walwyn (1956–2003), Kittian footballer
Myron Walwyn (born 1972), English politician
Steve Walwyn (born 1956), Musician
Thomas Walwyn (disambiguation), multiple people